Dark Matter is a speculative fiction novel from Michelle Paver. Part horror, part ghost story, it was published in the UK on October 21, 2010.

Plot introduction
In London in 1937, 28-year-old Jack Miller is stuck in a dead-end job and jumps at the chance to be a wireless operator on a year-long Arctic expedition to Gruhuken on the northeast coast of Svalbard, though he has reservations about the class divide separating him from the other, Oxford University educated, members of the team. Bad luck seems to dog the expedition and when they arrive at Longyearbyen for the last leg of their journey, they are warned to choose another destination as their base, but the vague rumours about Gruhuken fail to dissuade them.

Critical reception
Eric Brown of The Guardian described the book as "a spellbinding read" and "the kind of subtly unsettling, understated ghost story MR James might have written had he visited the Arctic."

Dark Matter was nominated for a Shirley Jackson Award for best novel.

Paver includes a number of references to the author Robert Louis Stevenson. Firstly, the Stevenson screen is an instrument designed by Robert Louis Stevenson's father. Secondly, the character Gus Balfour's namesake comes from Robert Louis Stevenson's mother's maiden name; Balfour. This name is also shared by Stevenson's protagonist of his novel Kidnapped.

References

External links 
 

2010 British novels
Novels set in the Arctic
Fiction set in 1937
Svalbard in fiction
Orion Books books